Cast of Shadows is a 2005 suspense novel by the American writer Kevin Guilfoile. It was published in the United Kingdom under the title Wicker.

Plot summary

The book's plot is set in the near future at a time when cloning has been legalised in the U.S. It is based around a Chicago-based cloning doctor, Davis Moore, whose daughter is brutally raped and killed. The doctor uses the murderer's DNA to clone him. The resulting clone is a boy called Justin Finn, whom Moore follows throughout his life, hoping the boy will offer a glimpse into the killer's psyche and perhaps enable Moore to find the identity of his daughter's murderer.

External links
 Review of Cast of Shadows at SFFWorld.com

2005 American novels
American thriller novels
American science fiction novels
Novels about rape
Novels set in Chicago